The Abernathy Farm is a historic farmhouse in Giles County, Tennessee. It was built in 1855 for Burwell Abernathy II and his wife, Samuella Dewees Tannehill. It has been listed on the National Register of Historic Places since April 19, 2001.

References

Houses on the National Register of Historic Places in Tennessee
Greek Revival houses in Tennessee
Houses completed in 1855
Houses in Giles County, Tennessee
Historic districts on the National Register of Historic Places in Tennessee